The Canton of Rivesaltes is a French former canton of the Pyrénées-Orientales department, in the Languedoc-Roussillon region. It had 26,526 inhabitants (2012). It was disbanded following the French canton reorganisation which came into effect in March 2015.

Composition
The canton of Rivesaltes comprised 8 communes:
Rivesaltes 
Cases-de-Pène
Espira-de-l'Agly
Opoul-Périllos
Peyrestortes
Pia
Salses-le-Château
Vingrau

References

Rivesaltes
2015 disestablishments in France
States and territories disestablished in 2015